The Ada County Board of Commissioners is a county legislative council with jurisdiction over Ada County, Idaho. The board consists of three elected commissioners who serve four-year terms. The board is responsible for managing the county's land usage and public services. The board has executive and policy-making power, in addition to the ability to appoint and remove county department heads.

Members 
There are three members of the board of commissioners, elected to serve four-year terms. The governor of Idaho has the ability to fill vacancies on the board.

References 

County governing bodies in the United States
County government in Idaho
Local government in Idaho
Ada County, Idaho
Government of Idaho